Atlantis: The Lost Empire – Trial by Fire is a 2001 first-person shooter game developed by Zombie Studios and published by Disney Interactive. It was released on May 18, 2001, for Microsoft Windows. The game is based on the film Atlantis: The Lost Empire.

The first levels correspond to Atlantis: The Lost Empire – Search for the Journal, which was distributed separately weeks earlier in 2001, as a demo to promote Trial by Fire.

Gameplay
This game mainly follows the events in the movie. The player begins on the USS Ulysses as the Leviathan is attacking, and must escape through the underwater cave system on a subpod, evading Leviathan spawn. The player must navigate through the caverns to Atlantis, and solve puzzles to reach the crystal at the end of the game.

Reception

Trial by Fire was met with mixed reviews, as GameRankings gave it a score of 56.22%, while Metacritic gave it 50 out of 100.

The game was rated 5 out of 10 by IGN, which called the levels "incredibly short, small, and fairly uninspired" and recommended to avoid the game.

References

External links

2001 video games
Atlantis: The Lost Empire
Disney video games
Disney Interactive
First-person shooters
Multiplayer and single-player video games
Video games based on animated films
Video games based on films
Video games developed in the United States
Video games set in the 1900s
Video games set in 1914
Video games set in Atlantis
Video games set in Iceland
Windows-only games
Windows games
Zombie Studios games